Maksim Sergeyevich Maksimov (born 4 November 1995) is a Russian football player who plays for FC Fakel Voronezh.

Club career
He started his professional career in Lithuania with Atlantas. After moving to Riteriai (known as FK Trakai at the time), he scored 7 goals in 6 games in the Europa League qualifiers, helping his club eliminate Scottish club St Johnstone and Swedish IFK Norrköping. Shortly after he transferred to Macedonian club Vardar. After a long investigation, on 27 May 2019 FIFA banned Maksimov from playing for 4 months and Vardar from acquiring new players for two transfer windows due to irregularities with his transfer.

On 28 August 2019 he signed a 2-year contract with Russian Football National League club FC Torpedo Moscow.

He made his professional debut in the Russian Football National League for Torpedo on 29 September 2019 in a game against FC Neftekhimik Nizhnekamsk. He started the game and was substituted at half-time. He scored his first Torpedo goal on 12 October 2019, a late winning goal in a 3–2 victory over FC Spartak-2 Moscow. On 26 November 2019, his contract was dissolved by mutual consent.

On 21 August 2020, he was on trials with Serbian SuperLiga side FK Napredak Kruševac.

Maksimov made his Russian Premier League debut for FC Fakel Voronezh on 17 July 2022 against FC Krasnodar.

Honours
Individual
Russian Football National League top scorer: 2021–22 (22 goals).

Career statistics

References

External links
 Profile by Russian Football National League
 
 

1995 births
Footballers from Voronezh
Living people
Russian footballers
Association football forwards
FK Atlantas players
FK Riteriai players
FK Vardar players
FK RFS players
FC Torpedo Moscow players
FK Napredak Kruševac players
FC Fakel Voronezh players
A Lyga players
Macedonian First Football League players
Latvian Higher League players
Russian First League players
Russian Premier League players
Russian expatriate footballers
Expatriate footballers in Lithuania
Russian expatriate sportspeople in Lithuania
Expatriate footballers in North Macedonia
Russian expatriate sportspeople in North Macedonia
Expatriate footballers in Latvia
Russian expatriate sportspeople in Latvia
Expatriate footballers in Serbia
Russian expatriate sportspeople in Serbia